General Yamamoto may refer to:

Isoroku Yamamoto (1884–1943), Japanese admiral in World War II, also called "General Yamamoto"
Yamamoto Kansuke (general) (1501–1561)
List of Soul Reapers in Bleach#Genryūsai Shigekuni Yamamoto, fictional character, also called "captain" and/or "general" Yamamoto